The Nationaal Archief (NA) is the national archives of the Netherlands, located in The Hague. It houses collections for the central government, the province of South Holland, and the former County of Holland. There is also material from private institutions and individuals with an association to the Dutch government or the political or social history of the Netherlands. The Nationaal Archief holds the Archives of the Dutch East India Company from 1602–1811, which were, along with related records held by South Africa, India, Sri Lanka and Indonesia, inscribed on UNESCO's Memory of the World Programme Register in 2003 in recognition of their historical value.
Recently, the photographic archives of Spaarnestad Photo were included in the Nationaal Archief. It has been announced that Wikipedia will receive user rights over many photos from these archives.

The Netherlands Antilles had a separate Nationaal Archief, which was dissolved when the dissolution of the Netherlands Antilles took place.

The entrance links to a walkway leading to the sister organizations housed in the same building. The large complex comprises a large apparatus to keep documents stored in optimum conditions, which the NA maintains (with government subsidies) for its sister organizations. The list of organizations housed in the complex adjoining The Hague Central Station are:
 Spaarnestad Photo archive (formerly of Haarlem)
 Biografisch Portaal
The Koninklijke Bibliotheek (KB)
The Centraal Bureau voor Genealogie (CBG)
The Digital Library for Dutch Literature (DBNL)
The International Institute of Social History (IISG)
The Onderzoekscentrum voor Geschiedenis en Cultuur (OGC),
The Parlementair Documentatie Centrum (PDC)
The Netherlands Institute for Art History (RKD)
The Netherlands Music Institute (NMI)
 Literatuurmuseum (LM)

See also 
 List of national archives

References

External links

National Digital Archives of the Netherlands 
National Archives of the Netherlands 

Archives in the Netherlands
Government of the Netherlands
Historiography of the Netherlands
Netherlands
Photo archives in the Netherlands